Magnus Andreas Thulstrup Clasen Konow (1 September 1887 – 25 August 1972) was a Norwegian sailor who competed in the 1908 Summer Olympics, in the 1912 Summer Olympics, in the 1920 Summer Olympics, in the 1928 Summer Olympics, in the 1936 Summer Olympics, and in the 1948 Summer Olympics.

In 1908 he was a crew member of the Norwegian boat Fram which finished fourth in the 8 metre class competition. Four years later he won the gold medal as a crew member of the Norwegian boat Magda IX in the 12 metre class.

In 1920 he won his second gold medal as part of the Norwegian boat Sildra. In his fourth Olympic Games he was a crew member of the Norwegian Noreg which finished fourth in the 8 metre class competition. He won his third medal at the 1936 Olympics as helmsman of the Norwegian Lully II. They won silver in the 6 metre class event. His son Karsten Konow was one of the crew members.

His sixth and last Olympic appearance was 1948 at the London Games. He was the helmsman of the Norwegian boat Apache which finished fourth in the 6 metre class competition.

He is one of only five athletes who have competed in the Olympics over a span of 40 years, along with fencer Ivan Joseph Martin Osiier, sailors Paul Elvstrøm and Durward Knowles and showjumper Ian Millar.

Family:

Magnus Andreas Thulstrup Clasen Konow, (1 September 1887 - 25 August 1972), was born in Stokke, Vestfold, Norway, he was the son of Einar Konow (1859-1946) and Dagny Clasen (1864-1900). He married three times; first (1) in 1913 with Else Nanna Grove from Denmark, (1891-xx). Else Nanna Grove was the daughter of Peter Andreas Grove, (København, 1856-1939) and Caroline Louise Frederikke Anette Ewald (f. 1869).

Children:

In his first marriage, Magnus Konow and Else Nanna Grove had three children together; Henny Else (1914-1999), later married to Ragnar Hargreaves, Vera Alexandra (1916-2009), later married to Lars Musæus, and Karsten Magnus (1918-1945). Later he married (2) Iselin Danelius (9 February 1915 - 16 March 1939), from Bergen, Norway, a short marriage. His last (3) marriage, lasting  throughout, was with Olga Rapaport (1913-2002), they had one son together, Magnus Einar Konow (1948-).

See also
 List of athletes with the most appearances at Olympic Games

References 

 

1887 births
1972 deaths
Norwegian male sailors (sport)
Olympic sailors of Norway
Sailors at the 1908 Summer Olympics – 8 Metre
Sailors at the 1912 Summer Olympics – 12 Metre
Sailors at the 1920 Summer Olympics – 8 Metre
Sailors at the 1928 Summer Olympics – 8 Metre
Sailors at the 1936 Summer Olympics – 6 Metre
Sailors at the 1948 Summer Olympics – 6 Metre
Olympic gold medalists for Norway
Olympic silver medalists for Norway
Olympic medalists in sailing
Royal Norwegian Yacht Club sailors
Medalists at the 1912 Summer Olympics
Medalists at the 1920 Summer Olympics
Medalists at the 1936 Summer Olympics